Edward Alfred Goulding, 1st Baron Wargrave  (5 November 1862 – 17 July 1936), known as Sir Edward Goulding, Bt, between 1915 and 1922, was a British barrister, businessman and Conservative Party politician. He sat in the House of Commons between 1895 and 1922, before being ennobled and taking his seat in the House of Lords.

Background and education
Goulding was the son of William Goulding by his second wife Maria Heath Manders, daughter of Edward Manders, of Dublin, Ireland. Sir William Goulding, 1st Baronet, was his elder brother. He was born in Ireland and educated at Clifton College and St John's College, Cambridge, and was called to the Bar, Inner Temple, in 1887.

Political career
Goulding was elected at the 1895 general election as the Member of Parliament (MP) for the Devizes division of Wiltshire.
He was re-elected in 1900,
and held the seat until the 1906 general election,
when he stood unsuccessfully in Finsbury Central.

He returned to Parliament two years later, when he was elected as MP for the borough of Worcester at by-election in February 1908,
a seat which had been left vacant for two years after a Royal Commission concluded in 1906 that there had been extensive corruption in the borough at the 1906 general election.
He was re-elected in Worcester at both the January
and December 1910 elections,
and was returned as a Coalition Unionist in 1918. He was created a Baronet, of Wargrave Hall in the County of Berks, in 1915 and sworn of the Privy Council in 1918. He stood down from the Commons at the 1922 general election, and was ennobled as Baron Wargrave, of Wargrave Hall in the County of Berks. Apart from his political career he was also chairman of Rolls-Royce Limited. He was Chairman of London Associated Electricity Undertakings Limited from 1935 to 1936.

Personal life
Lord Wargrave lived at Wargrave Hall in Berkshire and the then Shiplake Court in Oxfordshire. He died childless in July 1936, aged 73. The baronetcy and barony died with him.

Arms

References

External links
 
 
 UK Parliamentary Archives, Wargrave Papers

1862 births
1936 deaths
People from the Republic of Ireland
People from Wargrave
People from Shiplake
People educated at Clifton College
Alumni of St John's College, Cambridge
British barristers
Members of the Inner Temple
Goulding, Edward
Goulding, Edward
Barons in the Peerage of the United Kingdom
Goulding, Edward
Goulding, Edward
Goulding, Edward
Goulding, Edward
Goulding, Edward
Goulding, Edward
UK MPs who were granted peerages
Deputy Lieutenants of County Cork
English justices of the peace
Members of the Privy Council of the United Kingdom
Goulding, Edward
Barons created by George V